James Ellis Lindsey (November 16, 1948 – September 9, 1998) was a gridiron football quarterback. He played college football at Abilene Christian College where he broke the NCAA career records for both passing yards and total offense. He also pledged Sub T-16 in the fall of 1968 and went on to be skipper in 1969. He later played professional football in the Canadian Football League (CFL) from 1971 to 1974 and helped lead the 1971 Calgary Stampeders to the Grey Cup championship.

Early years
Lindsey was born in 1948 in Bay City, Texas. He played high school football in Sweeny, Texas. As a senior in 1966, he led Sweeny High School's football team to the Class AA Texas state championship.

Abilene Christian University
Lindsey attended Abilene Christian College in Abilene, Texas and pledged Sub T-16 in 1968. After serving as a backup as a freshman in 1967, he was the starting quarterback for the Abilene Christian Wildcats from 1968 to 1970. During his three years as the starting quarterback, he led the teams to a 21-9-1 record. A prolific passer, he set 19 Southland Conference records and broke the NCAA career record with 8,521 passing yards. He also became the nation's all-time leader in total offense. He was the Southland Conference Offensive Player of the Year in both 1969 and 1970 and was selected as the first-team quarterback on the 1970 Little All-America college football team.

Canadian Football League
He also played professional football in the Canadian Football League (CFL) for the Calgary Stampeders (–) and Toronto Argonauts. As a rookie, he served as the backup to Jerry Keeling, passing for 1,055 yards and eight touchdowns to help lead the 1971 Calgary team to a Grey Cup championship team. During his CFL career, he appeared in 59 games, passed for 3,178 yards and 17 touchdowns with 47 interceptions and 10 fumbles.  He also rushed for 430 yards and four touchdowns.

Later years and honors
Lindsey and his wife, Susan, had three daughters: Lauri, Jamie, and Melissa. In later years, Lindsey operated an insurance company called Jim Lindsey & Associates Insurance Company. He died of heart failure in Colleyville, Texas in 1998 at age 49. 

Lindsey was inducted into Abilene Christian's Hall of Fame in 1987. His jersey No. 10 was retired by Abilene Christian in 2006. His was only the second football jersey to be retired by the school, the first being No. 28 worn by Wilbert Montgomery.

In 2013, as part of the Southland Conference's fiftieth anniversary celebration, the conference picked an all-decade team for the 1960s, and Lindsey was chosen as the Player of the Decade for the 1960s.

At the time of his death, he had only one grandchild, Mallory. After his death he gained 7 more grandchildren Landon, Brooklyn, Payton, Tayden, Lincoln, Harley, and Deacon.

References

1948 births
1998 deaths
Calgary Stampeders players
Toronto Argonauts players
Abilene Christian Wildcats football players
American football quarterbacks
Canadian football quarterbacks
People from Bay City, Texas
Players of American football from Texas
American players of Canadian football
Alumni of George Washington Carver High School (Sweeny, Texas)